Daphne Todd OBE (born 27 March 1947) is an English artist who was the first female President of the Royal Society of Portrait Painters from 1994–2000, and who won the BP Portrait Award 2010 with a painting of her 100-year-old mother's corpse.

She attended the Simon Langton Grammar School for Girls in Canterbury, Kent.

She studied at the Slade from 1964–71.  In 1983 she won 2nd prize in what is now the BP Portrait Award, and in 1984 a "special commendation". She was elected a member of the Royal Society of Portrait Painters in 1985. She became a Freeman of the City of London in 1997 and received an Hon. Doctorate of Arts from De Montfort University in 1998.

In 1985 she won the Hunting Art Prize for oil painting with her picture "Four Spanish Chairs". In 2001 she won the Ondaatje Prize for Portraiture and the Gold Medal, and was appointed an OBE.

Notes and references

1947 births
Living people
20th-century English painters
21st-century English painters
20th-century English women artists
21st-century English women artists
Alumni of the Slade School of Fine Art
BP Portrait Award winners
English women painters
Officers of the Order of the British Empire

Society of Women Artists members